Leptophilypnion is a genus of tiny fishes in the family Eleotridae endemic to the Amazon Basin in South America. The larger Microphilypnus sleeper gobies are also found in the Amazon, and sometimes occur together with Leptophilypnion. The bottom-dwelling Leptophilypnion are typically found in shallow, stagnant or slow-flowing water among soft debris, leaf-litter or water plants.

Species
The recognized species in this genus are:
 Leptophilypnion fittkaui T. R. Roberts, 2013
 Leptophilypnion pusillus T. R. Roberts, 2013

References

Eleotridae